Zodiak Kids & Family (formerly known as Marathon Media, Marathon Animation, Marathon Productions or Marathon Media Group) is a worldwide French television production company based in Neuilly-sur-Seine. The company was originally founded as Marathon Productions, by Olivier Brémond and Pascal Breton in February 1990, and Vincent Chalvon-Demersay joined the team in 1999 to develop Marathon's animation programming, along with David Michel. The company was best known for the animated series Totally Spies! and Martin Mystery.

Marathon was acquired by Zodiak Media in 2008. In February 2016, Zodiak Media merged with the Banijay Group, and Marathon was folded within the process.

Animation 
These are the animated series produced by Marathon Production:
 The Mozart Band (1995) (Co-production with BRB International and Wang Film Productions)
 Kassai and Leuk (1996)
 The Secret World of Santa Claus (1997)
 Mythic Warriors: Guardians of the Legend (1998–2000)
 Marsupilami (2000–2012)
 Totally Spies! (2001–2008, 2013, 2023) (Co-production with Image Entertainment Corporation)
 Mission Odyssey (2002–2003)
 Martin Mystery (2003–2006) (Co-production with Image Entertainment Corporation and Rai Fiction)
 Atomic Betty (2004–2008) (Season 3 only)
 Street Football (2005–2010, 2022–ongoing) (Co-production with France 3, Okoo and Rai 2)
 Team Galaxy (2006–2007)
 Shaun The Sheep (2007–ongoing) (French dub only)
 Famous 5: On the Case (2008)
 Monster Buster Club (2008–2009)
 Gormiti (2008–2011)
 Detective Wolf (2008–2010) (Co-production with BOUDER MEDIA and France 3)
 The Amazing Spiez! (2009–2012) (Co-production with Image Entertainment Corporation, TF1, Teletoon, Telefilm Canada and Canal J)
 Sally Bollywood (2009–2013) (Co-production with France 3, Seven Network and 7Two)
 The Jungle Book (2010–2016)
 Rekkit Rabbit (2011–2013)
 Baskup - Tony Parker (2011)
 Redakai: Conquer the Kairu (2011–2013)
 Le Ranch (2012–2016) (co-production with TF1)
 Extreme Football (2014–2015) (co-production with France 3, Gulli, Rai 2 and Canal J)
 LoliRock (2014–2017)
 Zack & Quack (2014) (co-production with Nick Jr.)
 Get Blake! (2015) (co-production with Nickelodeon)
 Floogals (2016–2020)
 AstroKids (2015–ongoing) (co-production With BBC & HariboSky)
 Magiki (2017)
 Lilybuds (2018–2019)
 The Unstoppable Yellow Yeti (2021–ongoing) (co-production with Gigglebug Entertainment)
 Enigma
 Little Princess
 Mumfie
 The Selfish (co-production with France 3)
 Undercover Spirit (co-production with Studio 71)

Live Action
 The Intrepids (1992–1995)
 Extreme Limite (1993–1999)
 Teen's Confessions (1996)
 My Best Holidays (1996–1997)
 Sous le soleil (1996–2008)
 Léa Parker (2004–2006)
 15/Love (2004–2006)
 LazyTown (2004–2014) (French dub only)
 Dolmen (2005)
 Logo Story (2006)
 Mister Maker (2007–2009, 2016)
 Sous le soleil de Saint-Tropez (2013–2014)
 Millie Inbetween (2014–2018)
 The Lodge (2016–2017)
 Flatmates (2019–ongoing)
 Sisterhood
 Summer crush
 The intrepids
 Secrets every woman is a suspected
 Dock 13
 72 hours
 The challengers

Documentary
 Born Wild
 Born World

References

French animation studios
Mass media companies established in 1999
Mass media companies disestablished in 2016
1999 establishments in France
Banijay